The 1941–42 Brooklyn Americans season was the 17th and final season of the Americans NHL franchise. After the season, the Americans franchise was suspended for the duration of World War II. Although general manager Red Dutton had every intention of reviving the franchise after the war, the franchise was folded in 1946.

Offseason
The team's name was changed to the Brooklyn Americans and the team moved its practices to the Brooklyn Ice Palace. However, with no arena in Brooklyn suitable even for temporary use, the club continued to rent Madison Square Garden for games.

Regular season
The season started respectably for the Americans with a 3–3–1 record before going through a 10-game losing streak from November 22 through December 16. The United States entered World War II after the December 1941 attack on Pearl Harbor, and the Americans suspended operations after the season, expecting many of their players to enlist.

Final standings

Record vs. opponents

Game log

Playoffs
The Americans did not qualify for the playoffs.

Player stats

Regular season
Scoring

Goaltending

Awards and records
 Hart Trophy – Tommy Anderson

Transactions

See also
1941–42 NHL season

References

bro
Bro
New York Americans seasons
New York Amer
New York Amer
1940s in Manhattan
Madison Square Garden